A hegemon is a member of a ruling group.

Hegemon or hegemony may also refer to:

 Hegemon of Earth, ruler of that planet, in the Ender's Game series
 Hegemon of Thasos (5th century BC), Greek writer
 Hegemony (album), a 2017 album by Swiss band Samael
 Hegemony (video game series)

See also 
 
 
 Hegumen, the title for the head of a monastery in the Eastern Orthodox and Eastern Catholic Churches